This is a list of submissions to the 72nd Academy Awards for Best Foreign Language Film. The Academy Award for Best Foreign Language Film was created in 1956 by the Academy of Motion Picture Arts and Sciences to honour non-English-speaking films produced outside the United States. The award is handed out annually, and is accepted by the winning film's director, although it is considered an award for the submitting country as a whole. Countries are invited by the Academy to submit their best films for competition according to strict rules, with only one film being accepted from each country.

For the 72nd Academy Awards, the Academy invited 75 countries to submit films for the Academy Award for Best Foreign Language Film. The submission deadline was set on November 1, 1999. Forty-seven countries submitted films to the Academy, surpassing the record set in 1994. The Asian nations of Bhutan, Nepal and Tajikistan submitted films for the first time ever. The nominations were announced on February 15, 2000, and the winner was revealed during the awards presentation held on March 26, 2000. Belgium's submission Rosetta was not nominated, even though it had received the prestigious Palme d'Or at the Cannes Film Festival the previous year. Nepal received its first and so far only nomination for Himalaya: Caravan, a film made in the Tibetan language, which is spoken in parts of Nepal, about the country's now disappearing salt-trade system. The four other nominated films came from France, Spain, Sweden and the United Kingdom. The latter received its nomination for Solomon & Gaenor, the first film made entirely in Welsh and Yiddish. 

Spain eventually won the Academy Award for Best Foreign Language Film for Pedro Almodóvar's All About My Mother. It was the country's third win after Volver a Empezar (Begin the Beguine) in 1982 and Belle Époque in 1993. Almodóvar dedicated the award to the Spanish people and to Spain, and had to be dragged from the stage after an overlong speech in which he thanked numerous saints and relatives.

Submissions

References
General

Specific

Bibliography

72